For the Term of His Natural Life is a 1908 Australian silent film based on the 1874 novel by the same name by Marcus Clarke. The film is an adaptation of MacMahon's stage adaptation of the novel.

It was the fourth Australian feature ever made and is considered a lost film.

The 1908 film was the first screen adaptation of Clarke's novel, which was also later filmed in 1911, as a silent film known as "The Life of Rufus Dawes", 1927, again as a silent film (the most expensive produced in Australia to that time) and 1983, as a television mini-series.

Synopsis
The film's plot was a collection of highlights from the novel, such as 
"The Convict Mutiny in the 'Malabar'", 
"The Burning of the 'Hydaspes'", 
"The Murder on Hampstead Heath", 
"The Solitary of Grummet Island", and 
"The Life and Death Struggle Between Gabbett and his Famished Escapees". 
The movie kept the tragic ending of the novel, with Rufus Dawes and Sylvia perishing in a storm after Reverend North had helped Dawes escape.

Cast
Martyn Keith as Rufus Dawes
Rosie Knight Phillips as Sylvia Vickers
Mrs Barry Lane as Mrs Vickers
Frank Kenn as Lord Bellasis
Augustus Neville as Gabbett
Roland Conway as Reverend North
Mr Jerdan as Reverend Meekin
Fred Francis as Lieutenant Frere
Charles Morse as Jemmy Vetch

Production
The MacMahon brothers, James and Charles MacMahon, had enjoyed success producing a version of the novel on stage, and allocated a considerable budget for the movie, including a shooting schedule of eight weeks and location work in Port Arthur. The scene involving the burning of a sailing ship was staged with a model ship in a tank.

Reception
Based on a popular stage adaptation of the novel, the movie was a big success at the box office, running for eight weeks in Sydney at Queens Hall in 1908. It played in cinemas on and off until World War I. Screenings were usually accompanied by an actor, who would provide descriptive commentary to what was on screen.

See also
List of Australian films before 1910

References

External links
 
 For the Term of His Natural Life at National Film and Sound Archive
 

1908 lost films
Australian black-and-white films
Australian silent feature films
Lost Australian films
Films set in colonial Australia
1908 films
For the Term of His Natural Life
Silent drama films